The Stella hylomyscus or Stella wood mouse (Hylomyscus stella) is a species of rodent in the family Muridae. It is found in Burundi, Cameroon, Central African Republic, Republic of the Congo, Democratic Republic of the Congo, Equatorial Guinea, Gabon, Kenya, Nigeria, Rwanda, South Sudan, Tanzania, and Uganda. Its natural habitats are subtropical or tropical moist lowland forest and subtropical or tropical moist montane forest.

References

Hylomyscus
Rodents of Africa
Mammals described in 1911
Taxa named by Oldfield Thomas
Taxonomy articles created by Polbot